The so-called United Duchies of Jülich-Cleves-Berg was a territory in the Holy Roman Empire between 1521 and 1666, formed from the personal union of the duchies of Jülich, Cleves and Berg.

The name was resurrected after the Congress of Vienna for province of Jülich-Cleves-Berg of the Kingdom of Prussia between 1815 and 1822. Its territory is today split between the German state of North Rhine-Westphalia and the Dutch province of Gelderland.

History 

The United Duchies of Jülich-Cleves-Berg was a combination of states of the Holy Roman Empire. The duchies of Jülich and Berg united in 1423. Nearly a century later, in 1521, these two duchies, along with the county of Ravensberg, fell extinct, with only the last duke's daughter Maria von Geldern left to inherit; under Salic law, women could only hold property through a husband or guardian, so the territories passed to her husband—and distant relative—John III, Duke of Cleves and Mark as a result of their strategic marriage in 1509. These united duchies controlled most of the present-day North Rhine-Westphalia that was not within the ecclesiastical territories of Electoral Cologne and Münster.

Only a century after John III's marriage, however, the united ducal line fell extinct, prompting a war over the succession to the territories. The grandson of John III — Duke John-William — died without issue in 1609. His inheritance was claimed by the heirs of his two eldest sisters. Whilst the dukes, inspired by the humanism of Desiderius Erasmus, had managed to bear a "" between the confessional disputes ensuing from the Protestant Reformation, the heirs of the last duke's two eldest sisters were on opposite sides of the divide. The situation was further complicated by acquisitive desires of Emperor Rudolph II and the Wettin dukes of Saxony—the former particularly worrying to Henry IV of France and the Dutch Republic, who feared any strengthening of the Habsburg Netherlands.

The Lutheran Anna of Prussia was married to John Sigismund, Elector of Brandenburg, whereas Roman Catholic Anna of Cleves was married to Philip Louis, Count Palatine of Neuburg. As a result, after the War of the Jülich Succession (one of the precursors to the Thirty Years' War) was settled at Xanten, the Protestant territories (Cleves, Mark and Ravensburg) passed to Brandenburg-Prussia with the Catholic lands (Jülich and Berg) being awarded to the Palatinate-Neuburg. Years of being trampled by armies had destroyed much of the lands' wealth that had been so renowned under John William's father, William the Rich.

Philip Louis' grandson Philip William became Elector Palatine in 1685, with the Bergish capital becoming the seat of the Electorate of the Palatinate, until the line inherited Bavaria in 1777. In 1701, the Margrave-Electors of Brandenburg became Kings in Prussia; with Cleves-Mark as their first possession in western Germany, it was the seed of the future Prussian Rhineland.

Dukes of Jülich-Cleves-Berg, House of La Marck 
 1521–1539: John III, Duke of Cleves
 1539–1592: William the Rich
 1592–1609: John William

See also 
 Province of Jülich-Cleves-Berg

References

External links
 Archive.org: Online map of the United Duchies of Jülich-Cleves-Berg in 1635

Duchies of the Holy Roman Empire
Lower Rhenish-Westphalian Circle
Duchy of Cleves
Duchy of Jülich
House of Berg
Early Modern history of Germany
Early Modern Netherlands
Former states and territories of North Rhine-Westphalia
History of Düsseldorf
History of Gelderland
History of the Rhineland
Real unions
States and territories established in 1521
States and territories disestablished in 1614
1521 establishments in the Holy Roman Empire
1610s disestablishments in the Holy Roman Empire
Former duchies